Deltochilum valgum is a nocturnal species of dung beetle in the family Scarabaeidae, which has evolved a predatory lifestyle. While most other members of its family feed on faeces, D. valgum is highly specialised for eating millipedes; such a transition from scavenger to carnivore is rare.

D. valgum prefers live millipedes to dead ones, and seems to take no other food. In a typical attack, the beetle grasps the millipede's body with its mid and elongated, curved hind legs and then bites into the coiling prey at a joint between body segments. Sometimes this results in the prey being decapitated. The beetle then drags the victim to feed on it.

D. valgum is widely distributed in Central American rainforests. Two subspecies are recognised: D. v. acropyge Bates, 1887 and D. v. longiceps Paulian, 1938.

References

Deltochilini
Beetles of South America
Beetles of Central America
Beetles described in 1873